Cancio C. Garcia (October 20, 1937 – October 15, 2013) was a Filipino lawyer and jurist who served as an Associate Justice of the Supreme Court of the Philippines. He was appointed to the Court on October 6, 2004, by President Gloria Macapagal Arroyo and retired on October 19, 2007.

Early life 

Garcia was born on October 20, 1937. The youngest of four children and the only son of Juan Garcia and Benedicta Castillo, both illiterates, in the remote barrio of Concordia at Alitagtag, Batangas.

Education
Starting his education at the P. Gomez Elementary School (Manila), and thereafter at the Arellano (Public) High School (Manila), he qualified for admission into the College of Law of the University of the Philippines.  A product of the public school system, he graduated at the UP in 1961.  He obtained a post-graduate degree in Public Administration as a government scholar from the University of Santo Tomas in 1967.

Career
Honing his skills in the legal profession by serving as the assistant at the Macapagal Alafriz & Mutuc Law Offices, he went on to serve the government, first as Legal Office, then as Junior Presidential Staff Assistant in the Legal Office of Malacanang, and thereafter, as Solicitor in the Office of the Solicitor General, at that time headed by his former college professor, Solicitor General Estelito Mendoza.  Ripe for the judiciary after more than a decade of constant brushes with the law, he first sat at the bench as City Judge of Caloocan.  Serving for more than a decade in that capacity, and having won a Judge of the Year award, he rose to the Regional Trial Court (RTC) in Angeles City and later to the RTC in Caloocan.  Soon, then President Corazon Aquino took him back to Malacanang as Assistant Executive Secretary for Legal Affairs.  Aware that he is a Jurist at heart, President Cory appointed him to the Court of Appeals where he served for almost fourteen years until 2004, first as Associate Justice, then as Presiding Justice of that court, a position he held twice – from March 14 to July 29, 2001, and April 11, 2002, to April 8, 2003.  In October 2004, Justice Garcia reached the peak when President Gloria Macapagal Arroyo appointed him as Associate Justice of the Supreme Court, the Court's 156th Justice.

Death 
He died on October 15, 2013.

Career highlights 
 Legal Assistant: 1961 to 1962
 Junior Presidential Staff Assistant: 2/1962 to 6/30/1972
 Solicitor: 7/1/1972 to 2/16/1974
 City Judge for Caloocan: 2/17/1974 to 1/17/1983
 RTC Judge, Angeles City: 1/18/1983 to 11/4/1986
 RTC Judge, Caloocan: 11/5/1986 to 3/8/1988
 Assistant Executive Secretary: 3/9/1998 to 12/16/1990
 Court of Appeals Justice: 12/17/1990 to 10/14/2004
 Supreme Court Justice: 10/15/2004 to 10/20/2007

Awards 
 1976 Most Outstanding Judge, IBP CAMANAVA Chapter, January 29, 1977
 Outstanding Judge, Media Writers Association of the Philippines, October 12, 1985
 Certificate of Appreciation, Angeles City Metropolitan District Command, 1985
 Plaque of Appreciation for Judicious and Expeditious Implementation of the Dangerous Drugs Law, Philippine Constabulary Narcotics Command, February 1, 1986
 Certificate of Merit for Distinguished and Meritorious Service as Presiding Judge, Angeles City Lawyers’ League, January 5, 1989
 Plaque of Recognition as one of the Ten Outstanding Citizens of Alitagtag, Club Alitagtag, Batangas, May 5, 1989
 Plaque of Recognition for his promotion to the Court of Appeals, IBP CAMANAVA Chapter, November 15, 1991
 Certificate of Attendance for participation in the XVth Law Asia Biennial Conference, Law Association for Asia and the Pacific, August 1997
 Certificate of Attendance, Harvard Law School, June 2000
 Plaque of Recognition as Intellectual Giant, True Nationalist and Advocate of the Rights and Welfare of the Marginalized Sectors of Philippine Society, Kapatirang Plebeian Foundation, June 24, 2001
 Certificate of Appreciation, Supreme Court, Centenary Celebrations, July 11, 2001
 Outstanding Jurist Award, Consumers’ Union of the Philippines, 13th Annual National Consumers Award, May 31, 2002
 Ulirang Ama Sectoral Awardee for Law and the Judiciary, National Mother's Day and Father's Day Foundation of the Philippines, June 16, 2002
 Caloocan's Best for Law and Judiciary, Caloocan 41st Foundation Day, February 16, 2003
 Plaque of Merit for Raising the Level of Competence and Integrity in the Dispensation of Justice and Unselfish and Dedicated Service to the Judiciary, Philippine Trial Lawyers Association, Inc., May 9, 2003
 Parangal ng Bayan Award in Law and Judiciary, 18th Annual Parangal ng Bayan Awards, May 24, 2003
 Citation of Distinction, Philippine Judges Association, October 23, 2003
 Plaque of Appreciation as Most Outstanding Plebeian in Government Services for Judiciary, Kapatirang Plebeian Foundation, Inc. (KPFI), June 19, 2004
 Achievement Award as Most Outstanding Alumnus, Arellano High School, January 23, 2005
 Award of Distinction, Court of Appeals, February 1, 2006
 Certificate of Participation in the Conference on Terrorism and Rule of Law, World Jurist Association, May 22–24, 2006
 Plaque of Appreciation as Guest Honor and Speaker on the Induction of the New Officers and Members, Angeles City Lawyers League, September 29, 2006
 The Chief Justice Jose Abad Santos Award, Supreme Court of the Philippines, Oct 19, 2007
  The Gawad Anubing Award, Alitagtag, Batangas, May 4, 2011
 Hall of Fame, Philippine Judges Association, October 9, 2013

Professional and Civic Organizations 
 Member, Board of Judges, Ramon Ozaeta Awards, Philippine Bar Association, 2003
 Member, Board of Judges, Committee on Judicial Excellence, 2003
 Member, Order of Purple Feather honor Society, University of the Philippines College of Law
 Member, U.P. Law Alumni Association
 Member, Knights of Columbus
 Member, Philippine Bar Association
 Member, Philippine Judges Association
 Member, Third Philippine Judicial Delegation to the Federal Court of Australia, Melbourne, Australia, October 2001
 Director, City Judges Association of the Philippines
 Independent Director, Union Bank of the Philippines, 2008–2012
 Independent Director, San Miguel Purefoods Corporation, 2008–2013
 Independent Director, San Miguel Properties Inc., 2010–2013

Books 
 A Study of the Philippine Constitution. By Perfecto V. Fernandez, Jose A.R. Melo, Cancio G. Garcia, Aloysius C. Alday (1974) 	
 View from the Peak (October 2007)

Some notable opinions 
Jaka Food Processing v. Pacot (2005) — on notice requirement for dismissals of employees for "authorized causes"
Yuchengco v. Sandiganbayan (2006) – Dissenting — on the recovery of shares of stock in PLDT as part of the ill-gotten wealth of Ferdinand Marcos (joined by J. Ynares-Santiago & Chico-Nazario)
City Government of Quezon City v. Bayan Telecommunications — on legislated exemptions from real property taxes
 Nicolas-Lewis v. COMELEC (2006) — on absentee voting by Filipinos with dual citizenship
 Bantay Republic Act 7941 v. COMELEC (2007) — on duty of COMELEC to disclose names of party-list candidates

External links 
 SC Justice Garcia Ends 46 Years of Gov’t Service On Oct. 19 (Official Supreme Court Press Release)

Notes 

Associate Justices of the Supreme Court of the Philippines
1937 births
2013 deaths
People from Batangas
20th-century Filipino judges
University of the Philippines alumni
Justices of the Court of Appeals of the Philippines
Presiding Justices of the Court of Appeals of the Philippines
21st-century Filipino judges